General elections were held in Sikkim on 13 April 1974. They were the first elections in Sikkim to be held on the basis of universal suffrage, and also the last as an independent country. The result was a victory for the Sikkim National Congress, which won 31 of the 32 seats in the State Council. Kazi Lhendup Dorjee subsequently became Chief Minister. In May 1975 Sikkim became a state of India, at which point the State Council became the Sikkim Legislative Assembly.

Background
In the 1973 elections the Sikkim National Party won nine seats out of eighteen elected seats in the 24-seat Sikkim State Council. The Sikkim National Congress and Sikkim Janata Congress claimed there had been vote rigging, leading to protests. Political parties and members of the public demanded one man, one vote. On 8 May 1973 a tripartite agreement was signed between the Chogyal Palden Thondup Namgyal, political parties and the government of India. The agreement provided for the establishment of a responsible government under the supervision of a Chief Executive nominated by the Indian government.

Electoral system
Through the Representations of Sikkim Subjects Act, 1974, the Chogyal divided Sikkim into 31 territorial constituencies and one Sangha constituency. The 31 territorial constituencies were allocated as 15 for Nepalis, 15 for the Bhutia-Lepcha and one for scheduled castes, under a parity formula. The Sangha constituency represented Chogyal-recognized monasteries.

Campaign
The Sikkim National Congress contested all the 32 seats, whilst the Sikkim National Party contested five seats. Elections were held with the support of Election Commission of India.

Results

Constituency-wise

Council of Ministers
The Chogyal appointed the Council of Ministers on 23 July.

References

1974
Sikkim
1970s in Sikkim
Election and referendum articles with incomplete results